This article is a list of historic places in Nord-du-Québec, entered on the Canadian Register of Historic Places, whether they are federal, provincial, or municipal. All addresses are the administrative Region 10. For all other listings in the province of Quebec, see List of historic places in Quebec.

See also
List of historic places in Quebec
List of National Historic Sites of Canada in Quebec

Nord
Nord-du-Québec